Ovilla Christian School (OCS) is a private Christian school located in Ovilla, Texas, a suburb of Dallas, Texas.  Founded in 1990 with nine kindergarten students, OCS is a ministry of Ovilla Road Baptist Church (ORBC) and is co-located with the church on a  campus. The school is accredited by the Association of Christian Schools International (ACSI) and is a member of the Texas Association of Private and Parochial Schools (TAPPS). OCS participates in numerous extracurricular events, both athletic and academic, sponsored by ACSI and/or TAPPS.

OCS states that it has a maximum capacity of 578 students, and currently averages around 365 students, in a full K4-12 program.

References

External links
Ovilla Christian School

Baptist schools in the United States
Christian schools in Texas
Schools in Ellis County, Texas
Private K-12 schools in Texas
Educational institutions established in 1992
1992 establishments in Texas